Margaret Nicholson (c. 1750 – 14 May 1828) was an Englishwoman who assaulted King George III in 1786. Her futile and somewhat half-hearted attempt on the King's life became famous and was featured in one of Shelley's first works: Posthumous Fragments of Margaret Nicholson, published in 1810.

Life
Nicholson was born in Stockton-on-Tees in County Durham to a barber called George Nicholson. At the age of 12, she was found a place as a maid, and from then worked as a servant in various notable households, including those of Sir John Sebright and Lord Coventry. She showed no sign of mental illness. Before 1783, she was dismissed from her employment after a love affair with a fellow servant, and she seemed to fall on hard times. Her lover left her, and she supported herself through needlework, lodging in a house in Wigmore Street. She was described as "below the middle size, and of a very swarthy complexion".

On 2 August 1786, Nicholson approached the King as he alighted from a carriage at St. James's Palace on the pretext of presenting him with a petition, which was actually a blank piece of paper. As he received the supposed petition, she made two lunges at his chest with an ivory-handled dessert knife before she was brought under control. George, apparently fearing that she would be unjustly handled for such a pitiful attack, reportedly commanded: "The poor creature is mad; do not hurt her, she has not hurt me."

A search of her lodgings yielded a series of bizarre and clearly delusional letters in which she claimed to be the rightful heir to the throne. The newspapers assumed that Nicholson's insanity was brought on by melancholia over her lover's desertion. She was examined in the chamber of the Board of Green Cloth by Prime Minister and Chancellor of the Exchequer William Pitt the Younger, Home Secretary Lord Sydney, Foreign Secretary Lord Carmarthen, Sir Francis Drake, and Mr. Justice Addington. It was discovered that in July she had sent petitions to the King regarding her claim to the throne. In her reply to questions from Addington, she claimed to be a virgin, but also claimed to be the mother of Lords Mansfield and Loughborough, both of whom were older than she was. Her landlord, a stationer called Jonathan Fiske, stated that she was industrious and sober, and earned her living at needlework, making mantuas. She denied wanting to assassinate the King, and said she only intended to scare him. The noted physician Dr John Munro, who was already well known for his testimony in the murder trial of Laurence Shirley, 4th Earl Ferrers, certified her insane and she was committed to Bethlem Royal Hospital for life under the Vagrancy Act 1744 on the order of the Home Secretary, Lord Sydney. She died there 42 years later.

Legacy
George enjoyed a boost in popularity after the attack, and received congratulatory messages from all over the kingdom. His calm forbearance and progressive attitude to the insane were praised. He wrote that after "the interposition of Providence in the late attempt on my life by a poor insane woman" he "had every reason to be satisfied with the impression it has awakened in this country". Nevertheless, as a result of the attack, the security surrounding the King was increased from 4 guards to 11.

Popular depictions of Nicholson ranged from mad old spinster to romanticised heroine. In 1810, Percy Bysshe Shelley and Thomas Jefferson Hogg wrote and published a slim volume of burlesque poetry named after her, Posthumous Fragments of Margaret Nicholson. Rather than use their own names, the book pretended to be poems of Nicholson's own composition "edited by her nephew, John FitzVictor" and published after her death. In fact, she was still alive and living in Bethlem Hospital.

Nicholson's incarceration in Bethlem Hospital was extrajudicial, and George's political opponents depicted it as the act of a tyrant bypassing the rule of law. It was also opposed by hard-line conservatives, who thought it overly generous. However, on the whole it was seen as an act of humane kindness on George's part because a trial for treason was substituted with a hospital placement. In succeeding years, the introduction of "not guilty by reason of insanity", the Criminal Lunatics Act 1800, and the trial of another insane assailant, James Hadfield, formalised the treatment in Britain of insane persons accused of crimes.

Her attack on George III is depicted in the film The Madness of King George, where she was played by Janine Duvitski.

See also
John Frith (assailant)

References

External links

1750s births
1828 deaths
1786 crimes in Europe
Failed regicides
George III of the United Kingdom
People from Stockton-on-Tees
People acquitted by reason of insanity